Sevgi Yorulmaz (born 20 April 1982) is a Turkish Paralympian archer competing in the Women's compound bow W2 event. She lives in Denizli, Turkey. She is a member of the "Okçular Vakfı" ("Archers Foundation").

She competed at the 2020 Summer Paralympics in the Individual compound open event.

At the 2022 World Para Archery Championships in Dubai, United Arab Emirates, she won the gold medal in the Compound Women Open Doubles event together with her teammate Öznur Cüre.

References

1982 births
Living people
Sportspeople from Batman, Turkey
Turkish female archers
Paralympic archers of Turkey
Wheelchair category Paralympic competitors
Archers at the 2020 Summer Paralympics
Islamic Solidarity Games medalists in archery
21st-century Turkish sportswomen